First Presbyterian Church is a historic Presbyterian church located at 34 Brinkerhoff Street in Plattsburgh, Clinton County, New York. It was originally built between 1812 and 1816; after a fire destroyed the structure in 1867, it was rebuilt in the same location between 1868 and 1873. It is a rectangular limestone Gothic Revival style church. It has a slate gable roof and buttresses. It features arched openings and a central square bell tower with tall spire and embedded clocks on each side.

The congregation officially formed in 1797, after having met since at least 1792. The building was added to the National Register of Historic Places in 1982.

References

External links

Official Website

Presbyterian churches in New York (state)
Churches on the National Register of Historic Places in New York (state)
Gothic Revival church buildings in New York (state)
19th-century Presbyterian church buildings in the United States
Churches in Clinton County, New York
National Register of Historic Places in Clinton County, New York
Churches completed in 1816